General Griffin may refer to:

Benjamin S. Griffin (born 1946), U.S. Army four-star general
Charles Griffin (1825–1867), Union Army major general
John Griffin, 4th Baron Howard de Walden (1719–1797), British Army general
Simon Goodell Griffin (1824–1902), Union Army brigadier general

See also
Attorney General Griffin (disambiguation)